Hernan "Shades" Alvarez is a fictional supervillain appearing in American comic books published by Marvel Comics. He is the father of Victor Alvarez and is frequently seen with Comanche, his partner in crime.

Theo Rossi portrayed Shades in the Marvel Cinematic Universe series Luke Cage.

Publication history
Shades first appeared in Luke Cage, Hero for Hire #1 and was created by Archie Goodwin and George Tuska.

Fictional character biography
The unnamed person who grew up to become Shades was raised in Harlem. During his youth, Shades was involved with a woman named Reina Alvarez, with whom he had a son named Victor Alvarez.

Shades was recruited into a gang called the Rivals which also consisted of Carl Lucas, Willis Stryker and Comanche. As a member of the Rivals, Shades engaged in a fight with a rival gang called the Diablos and many other gangs while also committing petty crimes and working for crime lord Sonny Caputo. Shades and Comanche were later arrested by the police and sentenced to Seagate Prison where they were tortured by the ruthless prison guard Albert "Billy Bob" Rackham.

After suffering years of torture and abuse from Rackham, Shades and Comanche escape from Seagate, and decide that to get revenge on their former tormentor. Shades and Comanche try to get Luke Cage to help them in their plot only to learn that he has gone straight.

Shades and Comanche returned and became hoodlums-for-hire, often clashing with Luke Cage and his new partner Iron Fist. Even though they had a past association with Luke Cage, Shades and Comanche indicated that they would kill him if they are ordered to.

Sometime later, Shades and Comanche were hired by Ward Meachum where he gave Shades a visor that shoots energy blasts and gave Comanche some Trick Arrows. The two of them knocked out Ward Meachum where they have the bystanders tell Luke Cage that they have a score to settle when Ward Meachum regains consciousness. Luke Cage and Iron Fist tracked Shades and Comanche to the George Washington Bridge where they learned about their employer. Luke Cage and Iron Fist managed to defeat the two of them as the police arrive. When the police fail to remove Shades' visor, he used one more blast to knock Luke Cage and Iron Fist off the George Washington Bridge. Shades and Comanche were later sprung from prison. The two of them tried to hold off Luke Cage when he attacked the Meachum building only to be defeated when Luke Cage knocked a pillar on them.

Shades was among the several gunmen that were employed by Viktor Smerdilovisc. He and the others came in conflict with the Marvel Knights. Shades was taken down by Cloak and Dagger.

During the 2010 "Shadowland" storyline, Shades appears to have gone straight as he and Comanche have gone their separate ways. When in Hell's Kitchen, Shades became a community organizer. He worked with his son Victor where their relationship was strained upon Shades cheating on Reina. Upon Reina moving in with his brother Ignacio with Victor in his company, Shades remained in contact with them the best he could. When Bullseye had blown up a building during his fight with Daredevil on Norman Osborn's orders (as seen during the "Dark Reign" storyline), Shades was killed in the explosion while Victor survived upon absorbing the fragments of his father's visor. Upon Victor seeing the chi ghosts of the 107 victims of the explosion, Shades' chi ghost told him to open up and absorb more chi in the area which would give Victor enough power to fight back.

Powers and abilities
Shades is an expert at hand-to-hand combat.

In other media

Shades appears in Luke Cage, portrayed by Theo Rossi. This version's nickname comes from his signature pair of Ray-Ban sunglasses. In his youth, Shades was a runaway until he was taken in by crime lord Maybelline "Mama Mabel" Stokes and worked with her grandson Cornell "Cottonmouth" Stokes' gang until he is sent to Seagate Prison, where he enters a same-sex relationship with his best friend, Darius "Comanche" Jones. While in Seagate, Shades and Comanche become enforcers for the corrupt warden, Albert Rackham, and unwittingly contribute to Luke Cage receiving his powers after grievously beating him for attempting to expose Rackham. In the first season, Shades returns to New York and becomes Willis "Diamondback" Stryker's right-hand man before the latter sends him to assist Cottonmouth and Mariah Dillard. Following the former's death, Shades works with and eventually defects to Dillard after becoming disillusioned with Diamondback. Shades subsequently frames Diamondback for Cottonmouth's murder, helps Dillard send Cage to prison, becomes her lover, and helps her take over Cottonmouth's criminal empire. As of the second season, Shades reunites with a released Comanche while he and Dillard prepare to retire from their criminal activities and transition to insider trading. However, the pair face opposition from Bushmaster's violent revenge plot against her, NYPD Detective Misty Knight's investigation into their affairs, and Comanche secretly working for the NYPD. These events culminate in Shades reluctantly killing Comanche and Dillard receiving police protection. When she kills innocents while retaliating against Bushmaster however, Shades turns himself into Knight and takes police immunity in exchange for working as a mole to incriminate Dillard, which they eventually succeed in. Following Dillard's death, Shades is also arrested due to his deal with the NYPD being revoked.

References

External links
 Shades at Marvel Wiki
 Shades at Comic Vine

Marvel Comics LGBT supervillains
Fictional African-American people
Comics characters introduced in 1972
Fictional characters from New York City
Luke Cage
Fictional bisexual males
Marvel Comics male supervillains
Fictional gangsters
Characters created by George Tuska
Characters created by Archie Goodwin (comics)